Frunzyenski District is an administrative subdivision of the city of Minsk, Belarus. It was named after Mikhail Frunze and is the most populated district of the city.

Geography
The district, the biggest in Minsk, is situated in the western area of the city and borders with Tsentralny and Maskowski districts.

Transport
Frunzyenski is served by the Awtazavodskaya subway line. It is also crossed by the MKAD beltway.

References

External links
 Frunzyenski District official website 

Districts of Minsk